Jacques Le Nay (born 19 November 1949 in Plouay) is a French Senator, representing the Morbihan department. From 1993 to 2012 he was the deputy for Morbihan's 6th constituency in the National Assembly of France, as a member of the Union for a Popular Movement.
From 1989 to 2017 he was Mayor of Plouay, and from 1988 to 2001 he was a General councillor of Morbihan.

References

1949 births
Living people
People from Morbihan
Politicians from Brittany
Union for French Democracy politicians
Union for a Popular Movement politicians
Union of Democrats and Independents politicians
Deputies of the 10th National Assembly of the French Fifth Republic
Deputies of the 11th National Assembly of the French Fifth Republic
Deputies of the 12th National Assembly of the French Fifth Republic
Deputies of the 13th National Assembly of the French Fifth Republic
French Senators of the Fifth Republic
Senators of Morbihan